Neufa is the name of a small village in the town of Woodbury in the U.S. state of Connecticut. Located in the more rural northeastern part of town near where Bethlehem and Quassapaug Roads meet Connecticut Route 6, Neufa is home to a few older houses, as well as a Pizzeria and Deli. The Nonnewaug River flows through Neufa.

Residents of Neufa use the zip code 06798, for Woodbury, Connecticut.

Villages in Connecticut
Villages in Litchfield County, Connecticut